Saturday Night Live is an American sketch comedy series created by Lorne Michaels, who has produced the show for most of its run. The show has aired on NBC since 1975.

After the 1984–85 season, producer Dick Ebersol pitched a retool of the show that emphasized taped material over live material; NBC declined and Ebersol left, reinstating Michaels. Michaels hired a new and younger cast, but the 1985–86 season eventually received unfavorable reviews.

Michaels fired most of the cast before the 1986–87 season, hiring a new cast that included members Phil Hartman and Jon Lovitz. This cast would remain relatively stable until the 1990–91 season.

History
Dick Ebersol left SNL because NBC refused his request to shut the program down entirely for six months in order to shift much of the material from a live broadcast onto tape. NBC briefly considered canceling the show, but programming head Brandon Tartikoff (a fan of SNL) decided to keep it, re-hiring former producer Lorne Michaels.

1985-1986 cast 
Michaels wanted a younger cast for the show. He hired Academy Award nominee Randy Quaid, best known for his work in The Last Detail and National Lampoon's Vacation, as well as Robert Downey, Jr. and Joan Cusack. 

Michaels later said about the 1985-1986 cast that "perhaps I went too young". As Al Franken stated, "You couldn't do a Senate hearing [sketch] with Anthony Michael Hall, Robert Downey Jr., [or] Terry Sweeney. I mean, those guys aren't senators."

Ratings were weak, and some cast members did not expect the show to be renewed. NBC briefly did cancel the show at the end of the 1985–1986 season, but Michaels asked for another season. He ended the season's last show with a sketch in which the cast (playing themselves) get caught in a fire, and Michaels chooses to rescue only Lovitz. As the others try to escape the smoke and flames, the show asks, "WHO WILL SURVIVE?" and "WHO WILL PERISH?" before advising viewers to "TUNE IN OCTOBER 11th," a question mark appearing near each name in the closing credits. While the sketch satirized common cliffhanger season endings in 1980s TV shows such as Dallas, it also permitted Michaels to make changes to the cast. Show writer Robert Smigel later said, "Some of the cast members were kind of mad [about] that sketch. The ones who weren't Jon Lovitz."

Return to form
When the 1986-1987 season began, only Lovitz, Nora Dunn, Dennis Miller, and featured player A. Whitney Brown returned as cast members. Michaels went back to his original tactic of assembling a strong ensemble of relative unknowns, led by Dana Carvey, Phil Hartman, Jan Hooks, Victoria Jackson, and Kevin Nealon.

The first show of the 1986–1987 season opened with Madonna, host of the previous season opener, telling the audience that the entire 1985–1986 season had been a "horrible, horrible dream".

With the new cast, SNL gained renewed popularity. However, the 1987–1988 season was cut short by a writers strike. Gilda Radner had also been penciled in to host the season finale in the spring, but died in May 1989 after her cancer returned. Steve Martin, Radner's close friend, was scheduled to host SNL that night. Instead of his planned monologue, he presented a sketch from the 1970s featuring himself and Radner dancing.

Notable events
Dana Carvey's impression of George H. W. Bush is widely remembered, and Hartman's send-up of President Ronald Reagan kickstarted the most fruitful and successful period of political parody on SNL.

Nora Dunn made headlines in 1990 when she, along with original musical guest Sinéad O'Connor, boycotted an episode hosted by comedian Andrew Dice Clay because they found his misogynistic humor offensive. Cast member Jon Lovitz discussed Dunn's boycott of the show in detail during an episode of “The ABCs of SNL” with director Kevin Smith:

After this incident, Dunn was fired from the show.

Season breakdown

1985–1986 season

Cast
Joan Cusack
Robert Downey, Jr.
Nora Dunn
Anthony Michael Hall
Jon Lovitz
Dennis Miller
Randy Quaid
Terry Sweeney
Danitra Vance
Featuring
A. Whitney Brown (debut: March 25, 1986)
Al Franken (return: May 24, 1986)
Don Novello
Dan Vitale (final: February 8, 1986)
Damon Wayans (final: March 15, 1986)

Notes
 Damon Wayans was fired on March 15, 1986. He disliked how the show treated him, and developed a "straight" character intentionally so that Lorne Michaels would fire him. 
Terry Sweeney is the first openly homosexual male cast member. Sweeney is also the first openly gay actor ever to appear on an American television show, and the second of two SNL writers from Jean Doumanian's 1980–1981 season to be hired as a cast member in a later season.

1986–1987 season

Cast
Dana Carvey
Nora Dunn
Phil Hartman
Jan Hooks
Victoria Jackson
Jon Lovitz
Dennis Miller
Featuring
A. Whitney Brown
Kevin Nealon

1987–1988 season

Cast
Dana Carvey
Nora Dunn
Phil Hartman
Jan Hooks
Victoria Jackson
Jon Lovitz
Dennis Miller
Kevin Nealon
Featuring
A. Whitney Brown

1988–1989 season

Cast
Dana Carvey
Nora Dunn
Phil Hartman
Jan Hooks
Victoria Jackson
Jon Lovitz
Dennis Miller
Kevin Nealon
Featuring
A. Whitney Brown
Al Franken
Mike Myers (debut: January 21, 1989)
Ben Stiller (debut: March 25, 1989)

1989–1990 season

This season included SNL's 15th anniversary special.

Cast
Dana Carvey
Nora Dunn
Phil Hartman
Jan Hooks
Victoria Jackson
Jon Lovitz
Dennis Miller
Mike Myers
Kevin Nealon
Featuring
A. Whitney Brown
Al Franken

References

1985
Saturday Night Live in the 1980s
1980s in American television
1990s in American television